Venganur is a village in the Tittagudi taluk of Cuddalore district, Tamil Nadu, India. Venganur is famous for ancient, highly artistic Sri Virudhachaleshwarar Temple.

Venganur now belongs to Veppanthattai block in Perambalur district.

Demographics 
As per the 2001 census, Venganur had a total population of 2327 with 1142 males and 1185 females.

References 

Villages in Cuddalore district